Edith Hermansen (11 December 1907 – 9 February 1988) was a Danish film actress. She appeared in 30 films between 1946 and 1969. She was born and died in Denmark.

Selected filmography
 Kampen mod uretten (1949)
 Mosekongen (1950)
 Rekrut 67, Petersen (1952)
 Støv på hjernen (1961)
 Det støver stadig (1962)
 Venus fra Vestø (1962)

External links

1907 births
1988 deaths
Danish film actresses
20th-century Danish actresses